Poema Arcanus is a Chilean death/doom metal band that was formed in the early 1990s and has six full-length studio albums under their name. The band was originally named Garbage; they later changed their name to Garbage Breed and eventually settled on their current name of Poema Arcanus. Influences of Poema Arcanus include, among others, Autopsy, Candlemass, Fields of the Nephilim, My Dying Bride, Paradise Lost, Queensrÿche, Solitude Aeturnus, and Voivod. This band has been a live supporting act for bands such as Napalm Death, Moonspell, and Candlemass. They are currently signed to Transcending Obscurity Records.

Line-up

Current members
Claudio Carrasco – vocals (1991 onward)
Juan Díaz - bass guitar (2018 onward)
Igor Leiva – guitars (1991 onward)
Luis Moya – drums (1999 onward)

Former members
Michel Leroy – keyboards
Claudio Botarro – bass guitar
Pablo Tapia - bass guitar
Juan Pablo Vallejos - bass guitar
Igor Leiva – guitars
Eduardo Zenteno – drums
Roxana Espinoza – keyboards
Alonso – drums

Discography
Underdeveloped (under the moniker Garbage; demo, 1995)
Innocent Shades (under the moniker Garbage Breed; demo, 1996)
Promo Tape (demo, 1997)
Southern Winds (demo, 1998)
Arcane XIII (full-length, 1999)
Iconoclast (full-length, 2002)
Buried Songs: the Early Times (compilation, 2003)
Telluric Manifesto (full-length, 2005)
Timeline Symmetry (full-length, 2009)
Transient Chronicles (2012)

References

External links
Poema Arcanus Official Website

Chilean death metal musical groups
Doom metal musical groups
Musical groups established in 1991
1991 establishments in Chile
Chilean heavy metal musical groups